Telomerase-binding protein EST1A is an enzyme that in humans is encoded by the SMG6 gene on chromosome 17. It is ubiquitously expressed in many tissues and cell types. The C-terminus of the EST1A protein contains a PilT N-terminus (PIN) domain. This structure for this domain has been determined by X-ray crystallography. SMG6 functions to bind single-stranded DNA in telomere maintenance and single-stranded RNA in nonsense-mediated mRNA decay (NMD). The SMG6 gene also contains one of 27 SNPs associated with increased risk of coronary artery disease.

Structure

Gene 
The SMG6 gene resides on chromosome 17 at the band 17p13.3 and contains 30 exons. This gene produces 3 isoforms through alternative splicing.

Protein 
SMG6 is one of three human homologs for Est1p found in Saccharomyces cerevisiae. It contains a PIN domain, which is characteristic of proteins with ribonuclease activity. The PIN domain forms an alpha/beta fold structure that similar to that found in 5' nucleases. Within the PIN domain is a canonical triad of acidic residues that functions to cleave single-stranded RNA. SMG6 also shares a phosphoserine-binding domain resembling the one in 14–3–3 proteins with its other two homologs, SMG5 and SMG7. This 14–3–3-like domain and a C-terminal helical hairpins domain with seven α-helices stacked perpendicular to the 14–3–3-like domain together form a monomeric tetratricopeptide region (TPR). Differences in the orientation and specific residues in the TPR between SMG6 and its homologs may account for why SMG6 does not form a complex with SMG5 and SMG7 when recruited by UPF1.

Function 

SMG6 is broadly expressed in all human tissues. It has dual functions in telomere maintenance and RNA surveillance pathways. SMG6 binds single-stranded telomere DNA and cooperates with telomerase reverse transcriptase to lengthen telomeres. Overexpression of SMG6 induces anaphase bridges due to chromosome-end fusions and, thus, affects telomere capping, which may directly induce an apoptotic response. SMG6 also functions as an endonuclease in the NMD pathway. The catalytic activity of SMG6 resides in its PIN domain, which is required for the degradation of premature translation termination codons (PTC)-containing mRNAs in human cells. SMG6 cleaves mRNA near the premature translocation-termination codons and requires UPF1 and SMG1 to reduce reporter mRNA levels.

Clinical significance 
In humans, selected genomic regions based on 150 SNPs were identified in a genome-wide association study (GWAS) on coronary artery disease. Accordingly, the association between recent smoking and the CpG sites within and near these coronary artery disease-related genes were investigated in 724 Caucasian subjects from the Rotterdam Study. The identified methylation sites were found in SMG6 together with other genes, and several of these sites exhibited lower methylation in subjects currently smoking compared to never smoking.

Clinical marker 
A multi-locus genetic risk score study based on a combination of 27 loci, including the SMG6 gene, identified individuals at increased risk for both incident and recurrent coronary artery disease events, as well as an enhanced clinical benefit from statin therapy. The study was based on a community cohort study (the Malmo Diet and Cancer study) and four additional randomized controlled trials of primary prevention cohorts (JUPITER and ASCOT) and secondary prevention cohorts (CARE and PROVE IT-TIMI 22).

References

Further reading